Termen-Yelga may refer to:
Termen-Yelga River, a river in the Republic of Bashkortostan, Russia
Termen-Yelga Microdistrict, a microdistrict of the town of Ishimbay, Republic of Bashkortostan, Russia